NA-36 Hangu-cum-Orakzai is a constituency for the National Assembly of Pakistan. It covers the whole of the district Hangu. The constituency was formerly known as NA-16 (Hangu) from 1977 to 2018. The name changed to NA-33 (Hangu) after the delimitation in 2018. NA-36 (Hangu-cum-Orakzai) and Orakzai District were also included after the delimitation in 2022.

Members of Parliament

1977–2002: NA-16 (Hangu)

2002–2018: NA-16 Hangu

2018-2023: NA-33 Hangu

Elections since 2002

2002 general election

A total of 1,249 votes were rejected.

2008 general election

A total of 1,212 votes were rejected.

2013 general election

A total of 1,657 votes were rejected.

2018 general election 

General elections were held on 25 July 2018.

By-election 2022 
The seat became vacant after the death of  Khayal Zaman Orakzai, the previous MNA from this seat. By-elections were held on 17 April 2022. PTI's Nadeem Khayal won this seat by securing 20,772 votes against JUI-F's Obaidullah, who was supported by the Pakistan Democratic Movement, who received 18,244 votes.

See also
NA-35 Kohat
NA-37 Kurram

References

External links 
 Election result's official website

33
33